In Your Room is a box set by British synthpop duo Yazoo, also known in North America as Yaz. It is the first Yazoo release since Only Yazoo, a 1999 greatest hits compilation album.

The set was released by Mute Records (in North America by Sire Records) on May 26, 2008 and contains four discs.  In Your Room contains Yazoo's only two studio albums (Upstairs at Eric's and You and Me Both) in stereo and 5.1 remasters.  Also included is a disc of B-sides and remixes.  The fourth disc is a DVD containing the music videos for "Don't Go", "The Other Side of Love", "Nobody's Diary", "Situation" (1990 version) and "Only You" (1999 version).  Clarke's current Erasure partner Andy Bell contributed a new remix of "Nobody's Diary" to the Nobody's Diary EP, released prior to the box set. Afterwards there was also the release of the Reconnected EP.

Reunion concerts
The box set was issued in conjunction with a short Yazoo tour in Europe and the U.S.  It was the first time band members Vince Clarke and Alison Moyet performed together in over twenty-five years and the first time any songs from You and Me Both were played live, as the duo split shortly before the release of that album in 1983.  It was also the first time Yazoo toured North America.

Clarke has said about the concerts:

Moyet has stated:

Track listing

Disc 1 (CD): Upstairs at Eric's (Remastered)
"Don't Go"
"Too Pieces"
"Bad Connection"
"I Before E Except After C"
"Midnight"
"In My Room"
"Only You"
"Goodbye '70s"
"Tuesday"
"Winter Kills"
"Bring Your Love Down (Didn't I)"

Disc 2 (CD): You And Me Both (Remastered)
"Nobody's Diary"
"Softly Over"
"Sweet Thing"
"Mr. Blue"
"Good Times"
"Walk Away from Love"
"Ode to Boy"
"Unmarked"
"Anyone"
"Happy People"
"And On"

Disc 3 (CD): B-Sides and Remixes
"Situation"
"Situation" (Extended Version)
"Don't Go" (Re-mix)
"Don't Go" (Re-re-mix)
"Situation" (U.S. 12" Mix)
"Situation" (U.S. 12" Dub)
"The Other Side of Love"
"The Other Side of Love" (12" Remix)
"State Farm"
"Nobody's Diary" (Extended)
"State Farm" (Extended)
"Situation" (Re-recorded)

Disc 4 (DVD)
"2 albums, 4 singles and that was it..."
A short film featuring new interviews with Vince Clarke and Alison Moyet, and exclusive archive footage.
Promotional videos
"Don't Go"
"The Other Side of Love"
"Nobody's Diary"
"Situation" (1990)
"Situation" (Alternative Version) (1990)
"Only You" (1999)
Yazoo at the BBC
"Only You" (Top of the Pops) 29 April 1982
"Only You" (Cheggers Plays Pop) 24 May 1982
"Don't Go" (Top of the Pops) 15 July 1982
"Don't Go" (Saturday Live) 24 July 1982
"Don't Go" (Top of the Pops) 12 August 1982
"The Other Side of Love" (Top of the Pops) 25 November 1982
"The Other Side of Love" (Top of the Pops) 9 December 1982
"Nobody's Diary" (Top of the Pops) 19 May 1983
"Nobody's Diary" (Top of the Pops) 2 June 1983

5.1 DTS (24bit/96khz), AC3 and 2.0 LPCM 24bit/48kHz Mixes
Upstairs At Eric's
You and Me Both

Chart performance

References

External links
Official Yazoo page
Alison Moyet's official website

2008 greatest hits albums
Yazoo (band) live albums
Albums produced by Eric Radcliffe
Mute Records compilation albums
2008 video albums
Live video albums
Music video compilation albums
2008 live albums
Mute Records live albums
Mute Records video albums
Albums produced by Vince Clarke
Electropop video albums